Odontites is a genus of flowering plants in the family Orobanchaceae.

Phylogeny
The phylogeny of the genera of Rhinantheae has been explored using molecular characters. Odontites belongs to the core Rhinantheae. It is the sister genus to Bellardia, and then to Tozzia and Hedbergia. These taxa are closely related to the genus Euphrasia. In turn, these five genera share phylogenetic affinities with Bartsia.

Conservation
One of the Odontites species, O. granatensis, endemic to the Sierra Nevada in Spain, was so threatened that in 1993 only 1,500 plants survived in two locations. Due to conservation efforts the plant has made a comeback, numbering over 100,000 in 2006.

References

 
Orobanchaceae genera
Parasitic plants